Mario Fernández (born 26 January 1922) was an Argentine footballer. He played in three matches for the Argentina national football team in 1947. He was also part of Argentina's squad for the 1947 South American Championship.

References

External links
 

1922 births
Possibly living people
Argentine footballers
Argentina international footballers
Association football forwards
San Lorenzo de Almagro footballers
Newell's Old Boys footballers
Club Atlético Independiente footballers
Independiente Santa Fe footballers
Millonarios F.C. players
Argentine expatriate footballers
Expatriate footballers in Colombia